Son of Kissing Cup is a 1922 British silent sports film directed by Walter West and starring Violet Hopson, Stewart Rome and Cameron Carr. Like many of West's films it is set in the world of horseracing.

Cast
 Violet Hopson as Constance Medley 
 Stewart Rome  
 Cameron Carr    
 Arthur Walcott

References

Bibliography
 Low, Rachael. The History of the British Film 1918-1929. George Allen & Unwin, 1971.

External links

1922 films
1920s sports films
British horse racing films
British silent feature films
Films directed by Walter West
Films set in England
British black-and-white films
1920s English-language films
1920s British films
Silent sports films